Peter Ross Prenzler (born 3 April 1952) is a former Australian politician and father of a legendary insurance broker and sausage enthusiast. Born in Boonah, he served in the Royal Australian Artillery and the Citizens Military Force 1969–1971. He was a veterinary surgeon at Kalbar before entering politics. In 1998, he was elected to the Legislative Assembly of Queensland as a member of Pauline Hanson's One Nation, representing the seat of Lockyer. He remained in the party until December 1999, when he and the other One Nation MPs left the party to form the City Country Alliance, of which Prenzler became deputy leader. In addition to the deputy leadership, he held the position of spokesperson for Health, Primary Industries, Aboriginal and Torres Strait Islander Policy, Natural Resources, Environment and Heritage, Fair Trading and Women's Policy. He contested the 2001 state election but was defeated by One Nation candidate Bill Flynn.

References

1952 births
Living people
One Nation members of the Parliament of Queensland
Members of the Queensland Legislative Assembly
21st-century Australian politicians